Third S. Nijalingappa Ministry was the Council of Ministers in Mysore, a state in South India headed by S. Nijalingappa of the Indian National Congress.

The ministry had multiple  ministers including the Chief Minister. All ministers belonged to the Indian National Congress.

S. Nijalingappa became Chief minister after S. R. Kanthi resigned as Chief Minister of Mysore on 20 June 1962.

Chief Minister & Cabinet Ministers

Minister of State

See also 
 Mysore Legislative Assembly
 Mysore Legislative Council
 Politics of Mysore

References 

Cabinets established in 1962
1962 establishments in Mysore State
1962 in Indian politics
1967 disestablishments in India
Nijalingappa
Indian National Congress state ministries
Cabinets disestablished in 1967